The 15th Trampoline World Championships were held in Birmingham (Alabama), United States from May 10 to May 12, 1988

Results

Men

Trampoline Individual

Trampoline Team

Trampoline Synchro

Double Mini Trampoline

Double Mini Trampoline Team

Tumbling

Tumbling Team

Women

Trampoline Individual

Trampoline Team

Trampoline Synchro

Double Mini Trampoline

Double Mini Trampoline Team

Tumbling

Tumbling Team

References
 Trampoline UK
 
 
 
 

Trampoline World Championships
Trampoline Gymnastics World Championships
Trampoline World Championships
1988 in American sports